Polypoetes circumfumata is a moth of the family Notodontidae. It is found in Venezuela.

The larvae feed on Paullinia macrophylla.

References

Moths described in 1901
Notodontidae of South America